Peter Elson (January 18, 1839 – June 11, 1913) was a Canadian politician.

Born in the township of London, County of Middlesex, Canada West, the son of Joseph and Samantha Elson, Elson was educated at the schools of Middlesex and Hamilton. A farmer, he was deputy reeve of London township for two years, reeve for eight years, county councillor for 18 years, and warden of Middlesex County for one year. He was first elected to the House of Commons of Canada for Middlesex East in the general elections of 1904. A conservative, he was re-elected in 1908 and 1911. He died in office in 1913.

References
 
 The Canadian Parliament; biographical sketches and photo-engravures of the senators and members of the House of Commons of Canada. Being the tenth Parliament, elected November 3, 1904

1839 births
1913 deaths
Conservative Party of Canada (1867–1942) MPs
Members of the House of Commons of Canada from Ontario